Jay McCarthy (born 8 September 1992) is an Australian racing cyclist, who most recently rode for UCI WorldTeam .

Career
He finished in 91st place in the 2014 Giro d'Italia. In 2015, McCarthy showed promise by reaping a third place in the overall classification of the Tour of Turkey thanks to good placings in the mountains. He was named in the start list for the 2015 Vuelta a España and the 2016 Giro d'Italia. In October 2016 he was announced as a member of the  squad for 2017, with a focus on short stage races and punchy one day classics. In June 2017, he was named in the startlist for the 2017 Tour de France.

Major results

2009
 7th Road race, UCI Juniors World Championships
2010
 National Junior Road Championships
1st  Road race
2nd Time trial
 UCI Juniors Road World Championships
2nd  Road race
5th Time trial
2011
 3rd Time trial, National Under-23 Road Championships
 4th Overall Thüringen Rundfahrt der U23
1st Stages 1 & 2 (TTT)
2012
 1st  Overall Tour of Wellington
1st Young rider classification
1st Stage 2
 1st Trofeo Banca Popolare di Vicenza
 1st Stage 6 Tour de Bretagne
 1st Prologue Tour de l'Avenir
 2nd GP Capodarco
 4th Overall Toscana-Terra di Ciclismo
1st Points classification
1st Young rider classification
1st Stage 4
 4th Trofeo Alcide Degasperi
 4th Trofeo Internazionale Bastianelli
 5th Gran Premio di Poggiana
2015
 3rd Overall Tour of Turkey
2016
 1st Stage 5 (TTT) Tour of Croatia
 4th Overall Tour Down Under
1st  Young rider classification
1st Stage 2
 5th Road race, National Road Championships
2017
 3rd Overall Tour Down Under
 9th Cadel Evans Great Ocean Road Race
2018
 1st Cadel Evans Great Ocean Road Race
 1st Stage 3 Tour of the Basque Country
 2nd Road race, National Road Championships
 8th Grand Prix Pino Cerami
2019
 8th Cadel Evans Great Ocean Road Race
2020
 5th Road race, National Road Championships
 6th Cadel Evans Great Ocean Road Race

Grand Tour general classification results timeline

References

External links

1992 births
Living people
Australian male cyclists
People from Maryborough, Queensland
Cyclists at the 2010 Summer Youth Olympics